Sada "Pepe" N'Diaye (born 27 March 1975) is a Senegalese footballer, who played as a forward.

N'Diaye scored on his debut in the Football League for Southend United on 18 October 1997, away at Home Park to Plymouth Argyle in the 3–2 victory. He had a trial with Tranmere Rovers in October 2001.

He returned to his first club, Les Ulis, in 2007.

References

External links
 
  
 
 

Living people
1975 births
Footballers from Dakar
Senegalese footballers
LB Châteauroux players
ES Troyes AC players
Southend United F.C. players
Grenoble Foot 38 players
FC Gueugnon players
US Créteil-Lusitanos players
Ligue 2 players
English Football League players
Association football forwards